Emilio Z. Marquez is the former bishop of the Roman Catholic Diocese of Lucena. He previously served as the first Bishop of Gumaca in Quezon province from January 29, 1985 until his appointment as Coadjutor Bishop of Lucena and Apostolic Administrator of Gumaca on May 4, 2002. After the resignation of Bishop Bishop Ruben T. Profugo in 2003, Bishop Marquez was installed as the fourth Bishop of Lucena on November 4, 2003. He is also the Chairman & CEO of Mount Carmel Diocesan General Hospital in Lucena City, Quezon.  He later retired as Bishop of Lucena and was succeeded by Fr. Mel Rey Uy, the economer of Romblon Diocese, on July 29, 2017.

Education
1952-1956: High School - Mount Carmel Seminary - Tayabas, Quezon
1946-1952: Elementary - Lopez Elementary School
1956-1960: College - Mount Carmel Seminary, Sariaya, Quezon
1960-1964: Theology - UST Central Seminary, Manila
1973-1974: Post Graduate Studies - Theology - Faculdad Teologica del Norte de España, Burgos, Spain
1975-1977: Post Graduate Studies - Theology - Angelicum University, Rome, Italy
1977-1979: Post Graduate Studies - Canon Law - Lateran University, Rome, Italy

Ministries as a priest
1964-1973 - Professor, Mt. Carmel Seminary, Sariaya, Quezon
1965 – Professor & Prefect of Disciple, Mt Carmel Seminary
1969 – Professor & Spiritual Director, Mt Carmel Seminary
1970 – Asst. Parish Priest, Lopez, Quezon
1971-1973 - Professor & Vice Rector, Mt Carmel Seminary
1979-1983 - Rector, St. Alphonsus School of Theology, Lucena City
1983 - Parish Priest (Substitute), Pagbilao, Quezon
2003-2007 - Member, CBCP Commission on Canon Law
2003-2007 - Vice-Chairman, CBCP Commission on Social Action, Justice and Peace
2003-2013 - Chairman, CBCP Commission on Women
2013-2015 - Member, CBCP Commission on Canon Law
2013-2015 - Member, CBCP Commission on Catechesis and Catholic Education

Notes

1941 births
21st-century Roman Catholic bishops in the Philippines
Living people
People from Quezon
University of Santo Tomas alumni
Pontifical Lateran University alumni
Pontifical University of Saint Thomas Aquinas alumni
20th-century Roman Catholic bishops in the Philippines
Roman Catholic bishops of Lucena